Annona squamosa is a small, well-branched tree or shrub from the family Annonaceae that bears edible fruits called sugar-apples or . It tolerates a tropical lowland climate better than its relatives Annona reticulata and Annona cherimola (whose fruits often share the same name) helping make it the most widely cultivated of these species.
Annona squamosa is a small, semi-(or late) deciduous,
similar to soursop (Annona muricata).

Description

The fruit of A. squamosa (sugar-apple) has sweet whitish pulp, and is popular in tropical markets.

Stems and leaves 
Branches with light brown bark and visible leaf scars; inner bark light yellow and slightly bitter; twigs become brown with light brown dots (lenticels – small, oval, rounded spots upon the stem or branch of a plant, from which the underlying tissues may protrude or roots may issue).

They are pale green on both surfaces and mostly hairless with slight hairs on the underside when young. The sides sometimes are slightly unequal and the leaf edges are without teeth, inconspicuously hairy when young.

Flowers 
Styles white, crowded on the raised axis.

Flowering occurs in spring-early summer and flowers are pollinated by nitidulid beetles. Its pollen is shed as permanent tetrads.

Fruits and reproduction 

Aggregate and soft fruits form from the numerous and loosely united pistils of a flower which become enlarged  and mature into fruits which are distinct from fruits of other species of genus (and more like a giant raspberry instead).

The round or heart-shaped greenish yellow, ripened aggregate fruit is pendulous on a thickened stalk;  in diameter with many round protuberances and covered with a powdery bloom. Fruits are formed of loosely cohering or almost free carpels (the ripened pistels).

The pulp is white tinged yellow, edible and sweetly aromatic.

Chemistry 
The diterpenoid alkaloid atisine is the most abundant alkaloid in the root. Other constituents of Annona squamosa include the alkaloids oxophoebine, reticuline, isocorydine, and methylcorydaldine, and the flavonoid quercetin-3-O-glucoside.

Bayer AG has patented the extraction process and molecular identity of the annonaceous acetogenin annonin, as well as its use as a biopesticide.  Other acetogenins have been isolated from the seeds, bark, and leaves.

Distribution and habitat
Annona squamosa is native to the tropical Americas and West Indies, but the exact origin is unknown. It is now the most widely cultivated of all the species of Annona, being grown for its fruit throughout the tropics and warmer subtropics, such as Indonesia, Thailand, Taiwan, and China as far north as Suzhou; it was introduced to southern Asia before 1590. It is naturalized as far north as southern Florida in the United States and as south as Bahia in Brazil, Bangladesh, and is an invasive species in some areas.

Native
Neotropic
Caribbean: Antigua and Barbuda, Bahamas, Barbados, Cuba, Dominica, Dominican Republic,  Grenada, Guadeloupe, Haiti, Jamaica, Martinique, Montserrat, Netherlands Antilles, Puerto Rico, St Kitts and Nevis, St Lucia, St Vincent and the Grenadines, Suriname, Trinidad and Tobago, Virgin Islands.
Central America: El Salvador, Guatemala
Northern South America:  Suriname, French Guiana, Guyana, Venezuela
Western South America: Bolivia, Colombia, Ecuador, Peru
Southern South America: Argentina, Brazil, Chile, Paraguay, Uruguay

Current (naturalized and native)
Neotropic
Caribbean: Antigua and Barbuda, Bahamas, Barbados, Cuba, Dominica, Dominican Republic, Florida,  Grenada, Guadeloupe, Haiti, Jamaica, Martinique, Montserrat, Netherlands Antilles, Puerto Rico, St Kitts and Nevis, St Lucia, St Vincent and the Grenadines, Suriname, Trinidad and Tobago, Virgin Islands.
Pacific: Samoa, Tonga
North America: Mexico
Central America: Belize, Costa Rica, El Salvador, Guatemala, Honduras, Nicaragua, Panama
Northern South America:  French Guiana, Guyana, Venezuela
Western South America: Bolivia, Colombia, Ecuador, Peru
Southern South America: Argentina, Brazil, Chile, Paraguay, Uruguay
Afrotropic: Angola, Sudan, Tanzania, Uganda, Zanzibar, Kenya
Australasia: Australia,  Fiji, New Zealand, Papua New Guinea, Solomon Islands
Indomalaya: Bangladesh, Cambodia, China, India, Indonesia, Laos, Malaysia, Nepal, Pakistan, Philippines, Sri Lanka, Thailand, Vietnam
Palearctic: Cyprus, Greece, Lebanon, Malta, Israel

Climate and cultivation

It is sensitive to cold and frost, being defoliated below  and killed by temperatures of a couple of degrees below freezing. It is only moderately drought-tolerant, requiring at least  of annual rainfall, and will not produce fruit well during droughts.

It is quite a prolific bearer, and it will produce fruit in as little as two to three years. A five-year-old tree can produce as many as 50 sugar apples. Poor fruit production has been reported in Florida because there are few natural pollinators (honeybees have a difficult time penetrating the tightly closed female flowers); however, hand pollination with a natural fiber brush is effective in increasing yield. Natural pollinators include beetles (coleoptera) of the families Nitidulidae, Staphylinidae, Chrysomelidae, Curculionidae and Scarabaeidae.

Ecology
In the Philippines, the fruit is commonly eaten by the Philippine fruit bat (kabag or kabog), which then spreads the seeds from island to island.

It is a host plant for larvae of the butterfly Graphium agamemnon (tailed jay).

Uses
In traditional Indian, Thai, and Native American medicines, the leaves are boiled down with water, possibly mixed with other specific botanicals, and used in a decoction to treat dysentery and urinary tract infection.  In traditional Indian medicine, the leaves are also crushed for use as a poultice, and applied to wounds.  In Mexico, the leaves are rubbed on floors and put in hens' nests, to repel lice.
In Haiti, the fruit is known as cachiman and is used to simply make juice.
In Lebanon and Syria, it is made into a variety of desserts and sweets, referred to as ashta.

References

External links

Annona squamosa L. Medicinal Plant Images Database (School of Chinese Medicine, Hong Kong Baptist University)  

squamosa
Trees of the Caribbean
Flora of Brazil
Flora of the Cerrado
Plants described in 1753
Taxa named by Carl Linnaeus
Flora of South America
Trees of Guatemala
Flora without expected TNC conservation status